The New Lassie is an American children and family oriented drama series which aired in first-run syndication from September 8, 1989 to February 15, 1992. The series stars Will Estes (then using his real name of Will Nipper) as Will McCullough, Lassie's new master.  Real life husband and wife Christopher and Dee Wallace-Stone co-starred as Will's parents.

The New Lassie is essentially a sequel to the 1954 series, and was the latest in the line of works featuring the Lassie character, which debuted in the 1943 film Lassie Come Home, followed by several more movies and the aforementioned television series, which ran from 1954 to 1973.

Synopsis
The series centers on the McCulloughs, a middle-class family living in suburban Glen Ridge, California.  The McCulloughs are the owners of the then-present-day descendant of Lassie.  Real life spouses Christopher and Dee Wallace-Stone played Chris and Dee McCullough, with Will Estes (credited by his given name of Will Nipper) and Wendy Cox appearing as their young son Will and teenage daughter Megan respectively.

Jon Provost, who starred in the original Lassie series, portrayed Chris' brother Steve McCullough who was revealed in a later episode to be the adult Timmy Martin in an episode guest-starring June Lockhart in a reprisal of her role as Timmy's foster mother Ruth Martin.  In the episode titled "Roots", Timmy reveals that he was never officially adopted by the Martins, and thus couldn't go with them to Australia when they moved there (at the beginning of season 11 of the original Lassie series).  Subsequently, he was later adopted by the McCullough family, and began going by his middle name of Steven (Steve).

Cast
 Will Nipper as Will McCullough
 Christopher Stone as Chris McCullough 
 Dee Wallace-Stone as Dee McCullough
 Wendy Cox as Megan McCullough
 Jon Provost as Timmy Martin/Steve McCullough

Guest stars
Guest stars with a Lassie past included Roddy McDowall, who had starred in the first movie Lassie Come Home (1943) and Tommy Rettig, who had played Jeff Miller in the early years of the original television series (later syndicated as Jeff's Collie). Other guest stars included Leonardo DiCaprio and Todd Bridges.

Episodes

Season 1 (1989–90)

Season 2 (1991–92)

Production notes
The collie featured in The New Lassie was a fifth generation of Lassie. The dog was trained by Robert Weatherwax, the son of Rudd Weatherwax who trained the original Lassie. Robert was assisted by his only son Robert Jr.

Syndication
After its cancellation, reruns of The New Lassie aired on TV Land Canada in 2007.

References

External links
 

1989 American television series debuts
1992 American television series endings
1980s American drama television series
1990s American drama television series
1980s American children's television series
1990s American children's television series
American sequel television series
English-language television shows
First-run syndicated television programs in the United States
Lassie television series
Television series about families
Television series by Universal Television
Television shows about dogs
Television shows set in California